She Came to Me is a 2023 American romantic comedy film written and directed by Rebecca Miller, and starring Peter Dinklage, Marisa Tomei, Joanna Kulig, Brian d'Arcy James, Anne Hathaway, Harlow Jane and Evan Ellison.

Premise
Composer Steven Lauddem is creatively blocked and unable to finish the score for his big comeback opera. At the behest of his wife Patricia, he sets out in search of inspiration.

Cast
Peter Dinklage as Steven Lauddem
Marisa Tomei as Katrina 
Joanna Kulig as Magdalena 
Brian d'Arcy James as Trey 
Anne Hathaway as Patricia 
Harlow Jane as Tereza 
Evan Ellison as Julian

Production
Back in 2017, Steve Carell, Amy Schumer and Nicole Kidman were all previously attached to star in the film. In 2021, Anne Hathaway, Tahar Rahim, Marisa Tomei, Joanna Kulig and Matthew Broderick were confirmed to star in the film. Rahim and Broderick later left the project.

Principal photography was set to take place in late 2021 in New York City, but did not begin until April 2022.

Release
The film opened the 73rd Berlin International Film Festival on February 16, 2023.

Reception 
On Rotten Tomatoes, the film has an approval rating of 54% based on 13 reviews, with an average rating of 5.5/10.

References

External links
 
 

American romantic comedy films
Films shot in New York City
Films directed by Rebecca Miller
2023 independent films